Bieszczad is a Polish surname. Notable people with the surname include:

Gerard Bieszczad, (born 1993), Polish footballer
Seweryn Bieszczad (1852 1923), Polish painter

See also
 
Bieszczady (disambiguation)

Polish-language surnames